Fredi Albrecht (born 23 June 1947 in Albrechts) is a German former wrestler who competed in the 1972 Summer Olympics and in the 1976 Summer Olympics. He has since retired and become a referee.

References

External links
 

1947 births
Living people
Olympic wrestlers of East Germany
Wrestlers at the 1972 Summer Olympics
Wrestlers at the 1976 Summer Olympics
German male sport wrestlers
People from Suhl
Sportspeople from Thuringia